The Cremyll ferry is a foot passenger ferry across the Hamoaze (the estuary of the River Tamar) from Admirals Hard in Stonehouse, Plymouth, Devon to Cremyll in Cornwall. It is operated by Plymouth boat Trips, and runs approximately every 30 minutes, with a 8-minute crossing time.

History
The ancient ferry route dates back to at least the 11th century. For hundreds of years the route was worked with rowing boat, and with horseboats for carrying livestock, carts and cargo. In 1511 the Mount Edgecumbe family took control of the ferry and they would keep control for over four hundred years. In 1885 the first steam ferry was introduced, followed by a further six steam launches, culminating in the present vessels, the second SS Armadillo and SS Shuttlecock which were introduced in 1924 and 1926.

In 1945 the ferry was taken over by the Millbrook Steamboat & Trading Co Ltd, who rebuilt both of the ferries as motor vessels, renaming the SS Armadillo MV Northern Belle, which continued on the Cremyll Ferry route. The SS Shuttlecock was renamed MV Southern Belle, and was used on excursions. During the Millbrook company period many of the other vessels of their fleet were used as relief vessels to the MV Northern Belle.

In 1985 the Millbrook company withdrew from the Tamar, and the Cremyll Ferry was transferred to Tamar Cruising, who also bought the MV Northern Belle, and the MV Queen Boadicea II from Dart Pleasure Craft Ltd, the former parent of the Millbrook Company. Tamar Cruising built two new vessels for cruising from the Mayflower Steps in Plymouth: the MV Plymouth Sound and the MV Plymouth Sound II, though the latter vessel was sold in 1996. The MV Queen Boadicea II was sold in 1991. The fleet was increased to three again in 1998 with the purchase of MV Tamar Belle, formerly the MV Look Ahead II. She was replaced by the MV Queen of Helford in 2004, which also took the name Tamar Belle. All of these vessels were and are mainly used for cruising, and providing relief services on the ferry. MV Northern Belle continues as the main ferry, after 85 years in service.

The ferry was operated by Tamar Cruising, 1985-2017 . In 2008 Plymouth City Council decided to retender the crossing, and Tamar Cruising lost the contract to rivals Sound Cruising, who refurbished Plymouth Belle for the job. Just days before the operation was due to transfer to the new operator, Plymouth City Council announced that Tamar Cruising would continue to run it while an investigation took place into the fairness of awarding the tender to Sound Cruising. Eventually Tamar Cruising won the right to retain the crossing, and was awarded a new seven-year contract starting in June 2010, using a newly overhauled Northern Belle. The company uses Tamar Belle as the reserve vessel on the crossing. The new tender involved a recast clockface timetable, with boats running every half-hour. Additional sailings were added in the evenings, and the enhanced summer timetable was altered to begin earlier, and end later in the season. Fares were also reduced. Tamar Cruising were awarded the right to run the Cremyll Ferry until at least June 2017.

In 2013, the MV Northern Belle was badly damaged in a collision with a Royal Navy landing craft and was permanently taken out of service. It was replaced by the return of the Edgcumbe Belle which is still in service as the regular ferry.

Current service
The Cremyll Ferry was taken over by Plymouth Boat Trips in 2017, it continues to run its popular service using the MV Edgcumbe Belle, with backup ferry vessels, MV Island Princess, MV Spirit of Plymouth and the MV Plymouth Sound.

Fleet list

Steam period

Millbrook Steamboat & Trading Company period

Tamar Cruising period

See also

 Torpoint Ferry

References

External links
Cremyll Ferry

Ferry transport in England
Water transport in Cornwall
Water transport in Devon
Transport in Plymouth, Devon
River Tamar